My Best Friend  (Mon meilleur ami) is a French film starring Daniel Auteuil, Dany Boon, and Julie Gayet.

Plot 
François (Auteuil) is a middle-aged, Parisian art dealer who thinks he has everything. After telling a story at dinner about a funeral he attended where only a handful of people turned up, his colleagues suggest that no-one would go to his funeral. He may be materially rich, but he has no friends. Everyone at the dinner table starts to antagonise him about having no friends but François says that he does have friends (in reality, he only has clients). His business partner Catherine (Gayet) challenges him to a bet: François must introduce his best friend within ten days, or lose a valuable object, his antique Greek vase (worth €200,000).

The challenge is accepted. François has ten days to find a friend. As François travels through Paris in a taxi, revisiting old acquaintances who all reject him, he meets a trivia-loving taxi driver, Bruno (Boon). As the two spend an increasing amount of time together, they gradually start to form a friendship. François meets Bruno's parents and buys a worthless table from them for 10,000 euros to be a better friend. However, François's desire to win the bet threatens to destroy the best friendship he has ever had. He tricks Bruno into attempting to steal his vase so François can get his insurance money, but it was all a plot to show how much of a friend Bruno was. Bruno becomes furious and smashes the vase, ending his friendship. To make it up, François gets Bruno on Who Wants to Be a Millionaire by giving away his vase. This is a success, and brings the two together, as friends.

Cast
 Daniel Auteuil : François Coste
 Dany Boon : Bruno Bouley
 Julie Gayet : Catherine
 Elizabeth Bourgine : Julia
 Julie Durand : Louise
 Henri Garcin : Delamotte
 Jacques Spiesser : Letellier
 Audrey Marnay : Marianne
 Jacques Mathou : Bruno's father
 Marie Pillet : Bruno's mother
 Philippe du Janerand : Luc Lebinet
 Fabienne Chaudat : Épouse Lebinet
 Andrée Damant : Train lady
 Anne Le Ny : Casting woman

American remake 
In 2008, producer Brian Grazer hired Wes Anderson to write the script for an English-language remake of My Best Friend; Anderson completed a draft for the script, with the film tentatively called The Rosenthaler Suite, in 2009.

Notes

External links
Official site

2006 films
2000
Films directed by Patrice Leconte
French comedy films
2000s French-language films
2000s French films